This page is a list of the hat-tricks scored for the Denmark national football team. Since Denmark's first international football match in 1908, there have been 56 occasions when a Danish player has scored three or more goals (a hat-trick) in a game. The first hat-trick was scored by Vilhelm Wolfhagen against France B in the team's first-ever game on 19 October 1908. Poul Nielsen holds the record for the most hat-tricks scored by a Danish player with eight, five of which came against Norway. The record for the most goals scored in an international game by a Danish player is ten, which has been achieved on just one occasion: by Sophus Nielsen against France in the 1908 Summer Olympics semi-finals of the 1908 Summer Olympics, which was also a world record until it was broken by Archie Thompson broke it when he scored 13 goals in a 31–0 victory over American Samoa in 2001.

Preben Elkjær are the only Danish players to have scored a hat-trick at the world cup finals.

Hat-tricks scored by Denmark

Statistics

The following table lists the number of hat-tricks scored by Hungarianplayers who have scored two or more hat-tricks.

See also 
 Denmark national football team

References 

Hat-tricks
Denmark
Denmark